Paisiy is a village in Northern Bulgaria. It is located in Gorna Oryahovitsa Municipality, in the province of Veliko Tarnovo. As it was counted in the 2020 census, the village has a population of 118 people.

Geography 
Paisiy village is located at an elevation of 210 meters. The village is positioned northeast of Gorna Oryahovitsa, in a small valley between the villages of Strelets, Lozen, and Vinograd.

History 
Near Paisiy village there are traces of Thracian and Roman settlements and a preserved old Roman road.

Before 1934, the village was known as Arnauti, so named because of the Arnauts (Bulgarian: Arnauti) living there during Ottoman times.

Buildings 

 The school was built in 1936 and was closed in the 1970s due to a lack of pupils.
 Paisiy is one of the few villages in the municipality lacking a community hall and library.

Ethnicity 
According to the Bulgarian population census in 2011.

References 

Villages in Veliko Tarnovo Province